Adrian Johnson may refer to:

 Adrian Johnson (Oz), a character on the American drama series Oz
 Adrian Johnson (umpire) (born 1975), umpire in Major League Baseball

See also
 Adrian Johnston (musician) (born 1961), musician and composer